Johan Maria Gerardus Vandeurzen (born 2 June 1958) is a Belgian politician, member of Christen-Democratisch en Vlaams (CD&V), a centrist Flemish Christian Democratic party.

Vandeurzen holds a Master of Laws degree from the Catholic University of Leuven. He works at Geyskens-Vandeurzen in Beringen.

He became federal representative in January 1993 as a successor to retiring Luc Dhoore.

In 2001, his party, the CVP, was rebranded into CD&V, of which he became secretary-general. In 2004 he became party leader.

He remained party leader until December 2007, when he became Minister of Justice in the interim federal Verhofstadt III Government. He became the Belgian Deputy Prime Minister and Minister for Justice and Institutional Reforms in the Leterme I Government, which took office on 20 March 2008. On 19 December 2008 he resigned after a crisis.

After the 2009 Flemish regional election, CD&V was the largest party and he received 69,223 preference votes. When the 2009–2014 Peeters II Government took office, he became the Flemish Minister for Welfare, Public Health and Family. He continues to hold this office in the 2014–2019 Bourgeois Government.

Honours 
2014: Commander in the Order of Leopold.

Political career

 chairman of CVP's division Genk (1983–1989)
 member of the OCMW council in Genk (1989–1998)
 chairman of the OCMW in Genk (1989–1993)
 member of the national CVP's bureau (1989–1992)
 Belgian representative (1993 – )
 member of the city council in Genk (1995–2004; 2012–2015)
 leader of the CVP in the municipal council of Genk (1995–1998)
 secretary-general of CD&V (2001–2004)
 temporary chairman of CD&V (2004)
 chairman of CD&V (29 October 2004 – 21 December 2007)
 Belgian Minister of Justice since 21 December 2007 – 22 December 2008)
 Flemish Minister of Welfare, Public Health and Family (13 July 2009 – 2 October 2019)

References

External links
 

1958 births
Living people
Government ministers of Flanders
Christian Democratic and Flemish politicians
Members of the Belgian Federal Parliament
KU Leuven alumni
People from Heusden-Zolder
Belgian Roman Catholics
21st-century Belgian politicians